Karel Weis (13 February 1862, in Prague – 4 April 1944, in Prague) was a Czech composer.

Weis studied in Prague; amongst his teachers was Fibich. He was for some years a violinist at the Prague National Theatre, and later conducted opera in Prague and Brno. Between 1928 and 1941, he published a fifteen volume collection of folk songs.

Among his many compositions are eleven operas, (three in Czech, and eight, of which six are operettas, in German), five of which premiered at the Prague State Opera. Czech nationalists however criticised him for setting German texts.

Operas (partial listing)
Viola (1892) 
Der polnische Jude (1901) (on the same plot as Camille Erlanger's 1900 opera Le Juif polonais).
Die Dorfmusikanten (1905) 
Der Revisor (1907) 
Utok na mlýn (1912) 
Blizenci (1917) 
Lesetinský kovár (1920) 
Bojárska nevesta (1943)

References

1862 births
1944 deaths
Czech classical composers
Czech male classical composers
Czech opera composers
Male opera composers
Musicians from Prague